Abhesinh Motibhai Tadvi (born 1 June 1956) is an Indian politician. He is the Member of the Gujarat Legislative Assembly from the Sankheda Assembly constituency. He is associated with the Bharatiya Janata Party.

References 

1956 births
Members of the Gujarat Legislative Assembly
Bharatiya Janata Party politicians
Living people